Claudia Barrenechea (born 1 June 1977) is a Chilean biathlete. She competed in two events at the 2002 Winter Olympics.

References

1977 births
Living people
Biathletes at the 2002 Winter Olympics
Chilean female biathletes
Olympic biathletes of Chile
Place of birth missing (living people)